Kibei  was a term often used in the 1940s to describe Japanese Americans born in the United States who returned to America after receiving their education in Japan. Some Japanese Americans sent their children, many of whom had dual citizenship, back to Japan, so the children were educated in Japanese school systems and maintained the Japanese language as well as Japanese cultural traditions. Another reason was the strong anti-Japanese sentiment in the United States and these parents worried that they might be deported back to Japan. As a result, they sent their children to Japan, so they could survive either in the United States or Japan. The exact number is not known—perhaps about 11,000. It is said there were about 10,000 Kibei among Nisei (second-generation) Japanese Americans. 

Those men who were in school in Japan in late 1941 typically entered the Japanese army.  Those on the West coast of the United States were interned.  Many volunteered for service with the U.S., especially as translators.

Another case was Minoru Wada, an American citizen educated in Japan who served as an Imperial Japanese Army junior officer. He was taken prisoner in the Philippines in 1945.  He provided U.S. bomber crews with vital intelligence, and led the aircraft in a highly successful attack on the headquarters of the Japanese 100th Division.  He was motivated by a desire to minimize the loss of life through aiding to effect a swift end to the Pacific War.

Notes

Sources
"Impossible Subjects". Mae Ngai. Part III (p. 173). Princeton University Press. 2004. Princeton, New Jersey.
 Dictionary.com, http://dictionary.reference.com/browse/kibei. Retrieved 11-30-09.

Japanese-American history